
Gmina Czarne is an urban-rural gmina (administrative district) in Człuchów County, Pomeranian Voivodeship, in northern Poland.

Villages
Apart from the town of Czarne, Gmina Czarne contains the villages and settlements of Biernatka, Bińcze, Domisław, Domyśl, Grabowiec, Janowiec, Kijno, Krzemieniewo, Lędyczek Drugi, Łoża, Malinowo, Nadziejewo, Prądy, Raciniewo, Sierpowo, Sokole, Wierzbnik, Wronkowo, Wyczechy and Wygonki.

Neighbouring gminas
Gmina Czarne is bordered by the gminas of Człuchów, Debrzno, Okonek, Rzeczenica and Szczecinek.

References
Polish official population figures 2006

Czarne
Człuchów County